The term Catalanic Community, and the demonym Catalanic, were proposed by Miquel Adlert and other Valencianists as alternative concepts to the Països Catalans (Catalan Countries) and the Catalan nation, as a sole nation, with the intention to define a name that is accepted by all the territories of the Catalan-speaking community. Thus it was expressed his need in a manifest at Serra d'Or. June 1961, no. 6, signed, among others, by Alfons Verdeguer, Xavier Casp, Miquel Adlert, Jaume Bru i Vidal, Alfons Cucó, Rafael Villar and Beatriu Civera:

References

Bibliography 

 

Catalan culture
Valencian nationalism